Kathleen York is an American actress, screenwriter, and Oscar-nominated singer-songwriter recording artist. She was nominated for an Academy Award for Best Original Song for "In the Deep" from the 2004 film Crash.

Life and career

Actress
Acting since her teens, York is most known for her work recurring as Andrea Wyatt in NBC's The West Wing, the Dominick Dunne miniseries A Season in Purgatory, and received critical acclaim for her starring role as Naomi Judd in the NBC miniseries, Naomi & Wynonna: Love Can Build a Bridge. Her film credits include Nightcrawler, Crash, Cries of Silence, The Big Day, I Love You to Death, Flashback, and Cold Feet.

Series regular roles include In the Dark, Vengeance Unlimited, Aaron's Way and The Client List and recurring roles in How To Get Away With Murder, Jane The Virgin, Outcast, Murder One, The O.C and Desperate Housewives. Guest star appearances include True Blood, Curb Your Enthusiasm, All Rise, Longmire, House, and Revenge.

Screenwriter
As a screenwriter, York has developed television projects for Sony, Warner Brothers, Fox Television Studios and Fox Broadcasting Network and is an alumnus of The Showrunners Training Program.

Singer and songwriter

Musically, York achieved global recognition with her song "In the Deep", on whose writing and composition she collaborated with Michael Becker. It appears on her album Wicked Little High, and it was written for the 2005 film Crash. "In the Deep" was nominated for the Academy Award for Best Original Song, with York performing the song live at the 78th Academy Awards in 2006.

Her other music credits include the main theme song of the Sony Picture Seven Pounds, the Felicity Huffman indie Tammy's Always Dying (2019), as well as featured song placements in American Idol, Nip/Tuck, CSI: NY, In Justice, Warehouse 13, House, Army Wives and So You Think You Can Dance. She was the in-house song writer/composer for Season Two of the CBS series Family Law.  Her earlier releases include the self-titled Bird York. Her EP Have No Fear was released independently in 2008.

Filmography

Discography
Bird York (1999, Blissed Out Records)
The Velvet Hour (2005, Blissed Out Records)
Wicked Little High (2006, EMI) licensed only
Wicked Little High (2012, re-released Bird In The Hand Music)
Have No Fear EP (2008, Blissed Out Records)

References

External links
Official site

Paste Magazine spotlight - 7/25 Band/Artist of the Week

American women singer-songwriters
American television actresses
Living people
American soap opera actresses
American film actresses
21st-century American actresses
20th-century American actresses
American singer-songwriters
Year of birth missing (living people)